The Canton of Yvetot is a canton situated in the Seine-Maritime département and in the Normandy region of northern France.

Geography 

Composition 
At the French canton reorganisation which came into effect in March 2015, the canton was expanded from 12 to 53 communes:

Allouville-Bellefosse
Amfreville-les-Champs
Ancretiéville-Saint-Victor
Anvéville
Auzebosc
Auzouville-l'Esneval
Baons-le-Comte
Bénesville
Berville-en-Caux
Bois-Himont
Boudeville
Bourdainville
Bretteville-Saint-Laurent
Butot
Canville-les-Deux-Églises
Carville-Pot-de-Fer
Cideville
Criquetot-sur-Ouville
Doudeville
Écretteville-lès-Baons
Ectot-l'Auber
Ectot-lès-Baons
Étalleville
Étoutteville
Flamanville
Fultot
Gonzeville
Grémonville
Harcanville
Hautot-le-Vatois
Hautot-Saint-Sulpice
Les Hauts-de-Caux
Héricourt-en-Caux
Hugleville-en-Caux
Lindebeuf
Motteville
Ouville-l'Abbaye
Prétot-Vicquemare
Reuville
Robertot
Routes
Saint-Clair-sur-les-Monts
Sainte-Marie-des-Champs
Saint-Laurent-en-Caux
Saint-Martin-aux-Arbres
Saussay
Le Torp-Mesnil
Touffreville-la-Corbeline
Valliquerville
Yvetot
Vibeuf
Yerville
Yvecrique

Population

See also 
 Arrondissements of the Seine-Maritime department
 Cantons of the Seine-Maritime department
 Communes of the Seine-Maritime department

References

Yvetot